Rhizogonium novaehollandiae is a moss found in moist situations in Australia, New Zealand and Central and South America. In Australia it may be seen on wood, rock and tree ferns. A moss with creeping stems with erect or pendant branches, with two rows of leaves. The stem is clearly visible between them. When dry, the leaves fold towards each other. The length to width ratio of the leaves is less than three to one. The costa (vein/rib) is excurrent, showing a tip. The first European to collect this species was Jacques Labillardière. This plant first appeared in scientific literature in the year 1802, published by the German-Swiss bryologist Samuel Elisée Bridel-Brideri.

References 

Rhizogoniales
Flora of New South Wales
Flora of Victoria (Australia)
Flora of Tasmania
Flora of New Zealand
Flora of South America
Flora of Central America
Plants described in 1802